Bis(2-ethylhexyl) adipate or DEHA is an organic compound with the formula (CH2CH2CO2C8H17)2. It is the diester of 2-ethylhexanol and adipic acid.  It is a colorless oily liquid.

DEHA is sometimes called "dioctyl adipate", incorrectly.  Another name is di(2-ethylhexyl) adipate.

Use
As well as related diesters derived from octanol, decanol, isodecanol, etc., it is used as a plasticizer.

DEHA is used as a hydraulic fluid, and a component of aircraft lubricants. It is sometimes also used as an ingredient in PVC-based plastic wrap.

Toxicity
DEHA has very low toxicity. The LD50 is estimated at 900 mg/kg (rat, i.v.).

According to the International Agency for Research on Cancer (IARC), it is "not classifiable as to its carcinogenicity to humans (Group 3)."

References

Adipate esters
Plasticizers
Ester solvents